A.S. Ramat HaSharon is a professional basketball club based in Ramat HaSharon, Israel. The club are currently members of the Israeli National League.

History
The club first participated in the Super League in the 1989–90 season, remaining in the top division until 1992. The club had a second spell in the Super League between 2002 and 2006. Their best season was in 2003–04 when they finished eighth and qualified for the play-offs, losing 3–0 to Maccabi Tel Aviv.

Following relegation at the end of the 2005–06 season the club folded and reformed in the bottom division. At the end of the 2008–09 season they were promoted to Liga Artzit. They returned to Liga Leumit in 2013 after being promoted from Liga Artzit.

Roster

Notable former players

 Ari Rosenberg (born 1964)

External links
 Facebook page
 Eurobasket page

Basketball teams in Israel
Basketball teams established in 1980
Sport in Ramat HaSharon
1980 establishments in Israel